Saint-Leonard is a borough (arrondissement) of Montreal, Quebec, Canada. Formerly a separate city, it was amalgamated into the city of Montreal in 2002. The former city was originally called Saint-Léonard de Port Maurice after Leonard of Port Maurice, an Italian saint. The borough is home to Montreal's Via Italia.

Geography 
Saint-Leonard is located in the northeastern part of the Island of Montreal. It is bordered by five boroughs: Montréal-Nord to the north and northwest, Anjou to the east, Mercier–Hochelaga-Maisonneuve to the southeast, Rosemont–La-Petite-Patrie to the south and Villeray–Saint-Michel–Parc-Extension to the southwest and west. Jean-Talon Street East (Rue Jean-Talon Est) traverses through the borough, connecting it to Villeray–Saint-Michel–Parc-Extension and Anjou.

Features

Highways 
Quebec Autoroute 40 (Autoroute Métropolitaine), part of the Trans-Canada Highway, traverses the area. Exits 76, 77 and 78 are in Saint-Leonard.

Public Transportation 
Public transportation in Saint-Leonard is managed by the Société de transport de Montréal (STM). Saint-Leonard has an extensive bus network in the borough with a total of 14 bus routes. There are 12 daytime routes including two express routes and 2 night routes.  The STM's 141 Jean-Talon Est bus serves Jean-Talon Street East, with buses taking off at every 10 minutes maximum during peak hours from Saint-Michel and Honoré-Beaugrand metro stations. The Massouche Exo line runs through the borough and has a stop at Gare Saint-Léonard-Montréal-Nord. While lacking in a connection to the Metro system the future Blue Line extension of the Montreal Metro, which is previewed to open in 2029, will have three stations located in Saint-Leonard, with all of them located along Jean-Talon Street East. The REM de l'est is a planned light rail rapid transit system that would connect Saint Leonard and the rest of eastern Montreal to the Downtown core in less than 30 minutes. It will have a connection to the metro's future Blue Line extension at Lacordaire.

Malls 
Carrefour Langelier is a small-sized shopping mall located in Saint-Leonard, at the corner of Jean-Talon Street East and Langelier Boulevard. Saint-Leonard is also home to the Le Boulevard shopping centre, although a portion of the mall is actually located in Villeray–Saint-Michel–Parc-Extension.

Community Centre 
An important English, French and Italian community centre, the Leonardo Da Vinci Centre (Centre Leonardo Da Vinci) is located along Lacordaire Boulevard, near Aréna Martin Brodeur.

History
The parish of Saint-Léonard-de-Port-Maurice was founded in April 1886 and eventually became the City of Saint-Léonard-de-Port-Maurice on March 5, 1915. Saint-Léonard was traditionally a rural francophone hamlet with under a thousand people until the mid-twentieth century. The town became increasingly developed and urban throughout the twentieth century, benefiting from the expansion of the City of Montreal and a massive wave of Italian immigration which enriched life in the area with numerous cafes and restaurants. In 2016, the number of Italian-Canadians in Saint-Leonard was 25,510. Maghrebis people make up a diverse group in the city; 3,900 people are of Berber ethnic origin and 3,770 people are of Arab ethnic origin. It is one of the most diverse and multi-cultural neighbourhoods on the Island of Montreal and about 49% of the population is foreign-born. Today, the Saint-Leonard has the 10th highest population of Montreal's 19 boroughs and is the 8th most densely populated borough.

Italian-Canadian presence

The borough has one of the highest concentrations of Italian-Canadians in the city, along with Rivière-des-Prairies (RDP). As such, it has surpassed Montreal's rapidly gentrifying Little Italy as the centre for Italian culture in the city, with numerous cultural institutions and commercial enterprises serving the city's second-most populous cultural community. The stretch of Jean Talon Street between Langelier and Viau Boulevards has become known as Via Italia. By necessity, many services are available in Italian, English and French (the Leonardo da Vinci Centre, for instance, offers cultural activities and events in the three languages). The borough is characterized by its spacious, wide-set semi-detached brick duplexes (and triplexes, four-plexes, and five-plexes — an architectural style unique to Montreal), backyard vegetable gardens, Italian bars (cafés), and pastry shops serving Italian-Canadian staples such as cannoli, sfogliatelle, and zeppole. At some times of year, it is possible to observe seasonal Italian traditions like the making of wine, cheese, sausage, and tomato sauce in quantity. These activities bring extended families and neighbours together and often spill out into front driveways.

Demographics

Home language (2016) 

Mother Tongue (2016)

Migration

Sports and recreation

Aquatics

The Saint-Léonard Aquatic Complex was built in 2006 and is home to three swimming pools: one recreational basin, one  pool and one acclimation basin that includes a turbo bath spa. There are also two saunas, one for women and one for men.

Skate parks

Skaters can skate safely in any one of the two skate parks located in the city of Saint Leonard. Admission to these parks is free, and they are open to the public May through October.

Cycling paths

Saint Leonard has 10 km of bike paths around the borough, that connect various parks, pools and municipal structures. On November 1, 2022, the city of Montreal announced its Vision vélo 2023-2027 which plans to increase Montreal's cycling network by 200 km. This includes 2 REV (Réseau Express Vélo) routes passing through Saint-Leonard on Lacordaire boulevard and the other on Jean-Talon Street. If all goes to plan this will be the first time that Saint-Leonard will be connected to the rest of the Montreal bike network.

Hockey

Saint Leonard has two hockey arenas, Aréna Martin Brodeur, located on 5300 boulevard Robert, and Aréna Roberto Luongo, located on 7755 Rue Colbert. These arenas host local games, and usually provide food, locker rooms, showers and public free-skating.

Saint Leonard also has many outdoor hockey rinks in the winter. There are seven rinks set up before winter, and then they are iced when the temperature is appropriate. There was a delay of rink making in 2007 when the weather was warmer than usual.

Soccer

Soccer is a very popular sport for the youth in Saint Leonard. Every large public park in Saint-Léonard has a soccer field open to the public.

Figure skating

Both Saint Leonard arenas are used by the figure skating community. Many Olympic and World Champions have trained here in different disciplines like singles, pairs, dance and synchronized skating.

Other activities

The city has a domed football stadium, Stade Hébert, which is home to the Saint-Léonard Cougars of the CJFL football league.

There are bocce courts located at almost every public park.

Saint Leonard contains a cavern located at Pie XII Park.

Education

Schools
Since the replacement of denominational (Catholic/Protestant) school boards with linguistic (French/English) ones, Saint-Leonard is served by one school board for the English schools and a school service centre for French schools. All French schools are part of the Centre de services scolaire de la Pointe-de-l'Île (CSSPÎ) while all English schools are part of the English Montreal School Board (EMSB).

The French-language high school is École secondaire Antoine de St-Exupery.

French-language primary schools:
Alphonse-Pesant
Gabrielle-Roy
La Dauversière
Ferland
Lambert-Closse
Pie XII
Victor-Lavigne
Wilfrid-Bastien
Général Vanier

The English-language secondary school is Laurier Macdonald High School

English-language primary schools:
 Dante School
 Pierre de Coubertin School
 Honoré Mercier School

Public libraries

The borough the Saint-Léonard Library of the Montreal Public Libraries Network.

Saint-Leonard's first library opened in 1966, in a very modest house on Jarry Street. In 1974, the new city hall and current library were built side by side on Lacordaire Boulevard (photo to the right). Expanded in 1984, the library has modernized over the years and is home to the Port-Maurice Gallery.

Government

Federal and Provincial Representation 
Saint-Leonard leans heavily Liberal at both the provincial and federal levels. While at the municipal level it leans exclusively towards Ensemble Montreal.

Jeanne Mance-viger is the electoral district representing the borough of Saint-Léonard in the National Assembly in Quebec city. The current MNA is Filomenna Rotiroti from the QLP first elected in 2008.

Saint-Léonard—Saint-Michel is the electoral district representing Saint-Léonard in the House of Commons in Ottawa. The current MP is Patricia Lattanzio from the LPC first elected in 2019.

Borough council
Saint-Léonard is divided by Lacordaire Boulevard into two city council districts, Saint-Léonard-Est and Saint-Léonard-Ouest. The borough elects a borough mayor, who also sits on Montreal City Council; each district elects one city councillor and one borough councillor. The borough mayor, city councillors, and borough councillors make up the borough council. As of the 2021 Montreal Municipal Election the borough Mayor, borough council and both city councillors are all from Ensemble Montreal.

Mayors
Includes mayors of the former city (1886–2001) and current borough (2001- ) of Saint-Leonard:
Louis Sicard (1886–1901)
Gustave Pépin (1901–1903)
Léon Léonard (1903–1905)
Jean-Baptiste Jodoin (1905–1906)
Joseph Léonard (1906–1907)
Louis D Roy (1907–1910)
Wilfrid Bastien (1910–1929)
Pascal Gagnon (1929–1935)
Philias Gagnon (1935–1939)
Alphonse D Pesant (1939–1957)
Antonio Dagenais (1957–1962)
Paul Émile Petit (1962–1967)
Leo Ouellet (1967–1974)
Jean Di Zazzo (1974–1978)
Michel Bissonnet (1978–1981)
Antonio di Ciocco (1981–1984)
Raymond Renaud (1984–1990)
Frank Zampino (1990–2008)
Michel Bissonnet (2008- )

Notable people and companies
St-Leonard is the hometown of notable people such as Roberto Luongo, Nadia G and Martin Brodeur. Notable companies from St-Leonard include Saputo Inc., FSecur, Lafrenaie, FinePrints, and a few others.

Saint-Leonard is also the place were the Snow blower was invented by one of his citizen Arthur Sicard.

See also
 Boroughs of Montreal
 Districts of Montreal
 Municipal reorganization in Quebec
 Little Italy, Montreal
 Via Italia

References

External links
Borough website 
Leonardo Da Vinci Center
City of Montreal. Borrough of Saint-Leonard 

 
Boroughs of Montreal
Former municipalities in Quebec
Little Italys in Canada
Populated places disestablished in 2002
Italian Canadian settlements